Cinco Villas, in Aragonese: Zinco Billas, is a comarca in Aragon, Spain.

This comarca is named after the five historical towns of Tauste, Ejea de los Caballeros (capital comarcal), Sádaba, Uncastillo and Sos del Rey Católico. The former capital of the area was Sos del Rey Católico. Cinco Villas borders with Navarre in the west and completely surrounds its exclave of Petilla de Aragón.

Municipalities
Ardisa, Asín, Bagüés, Biel, Biota, Castejón de Valdejasa, Castiliscar, Ejea de los Caballeros, Erla, El Frago, Isuerre, Layana, Lobera de Onsella, Longás, Luesia, Luna, Marracos, Navardún, Orés, Las Pedrosas, Piedratajada, Los Pintanos, Puendeluna, Sádaba, Sierra de Luna, Sos del Rey Católico, Tauste, Uncastillo, Undués de Lerda, Urriés and Valpalmas.

See also
Castejón Mountains
Comarcas of Aragon

References

External links
 Cinco Villas official site
 Castles in Cinco Villas. 
 Comarcas de Aragón, Cinco Villas

Comarcas of Aragon
Geography of the Province of Zaragoza